Carolina Moraes Parra (born 16 November 1978, São Paulo, Brazil) is a guitarist and drummer for the Brazilian indie-electro band CSS. She joined CSS at the Tim Festival gig in 2004.

Besides CSS, she has played in many other bands including Ultrasom, Caxabaxa and Verafisher.

References

1978 births
Living people
Brazilian women guitarists
Brazilian drummers
Musicians from São Paulo
Women drummers
Women in electronic music
CSS (band) members
21st-century guitarists
21st-century drummers
21st-century women guitarists